The Dagua thrush (Turdus daguae) is a species of thrush found from Panama to north-western Ecuador. It was previously considered a subspecies of the white-throated thrush.

References

Turdidae